Eleutherodactylus rivularis is a species of frog in the family Eleutherodactylidae endemic to Cuba. Its natural habitats are subtropical or tropical moist lowland forest and rivers.
It is threatened by habitat loss.

References

rivularis
Endemic fauna of Cuba
Amphibians of Cuba
Amphibians described in 2001
Taxonomy articles created by Polbot